Ankush may refer to:

 Ankush Hazra, Indian Bengali actor
 Ankush, 1986 film
 Ankush Chaudhari, Indian Actor 
 Ankush Saikia, Indian Author
 Ankush Bains, Indian Cricketer
 Ankush Arora, Indian Actor and Singer

See also